The Crable Site is an archaeological site located on the Norman Crable farm in Fulton County, Illinois, near the Illinois River and Anderson Lake.  

Indigenous peoples occupied the site during the Middle Mississippian period,  about 900-1450 AD, with the earliest shells dating to about 800 AD and charcoal fragments dating to about 1420 AD.  The Crable Site can be referred to as a "Southern Cult" site because it was occupied during the Mississippian period and is characterized by artifacts and iconography that followed the adoption of maize as a main food source and chiefdom social stratification. The site has been observed and excavated multiple times, with the earliest known publication of the site's existence written in 1879. Edgar McDonald and his father excavated the site in the early 1930s, followed by the University of Chicago, and Dan Morse, who excavated and researched the site in the 1950s.

Geographical setting 
The site is located on a series of bluffs and ridges a few hundred feet from a spring, which most likely provided an abundant drinking water source for the people of the Crable Site. Dozens of mounds contribute to the “mound field,” the largest of these being about 12 feet high and 60 feet in diameter. The site has an area of about 100 acres with most of the artifacts found in an area less than 25 acres, located near the mound field.

Excavations and finds 

Four cemeteries have been discovered at this site, the largest estimated to have over 200 bodies. Most of the graves feature extended burial, in which the body lies flat in an extended position, and some also feature double burial, in which two bodies are buried at the same grave site. A large proportion of children buried at these cemeteries indicates a high infant mortality rate. The burial sites are heterogeneous, meaning that there was no clear pattern or uniformity in the orientation the bodies were buried or what they were buried with. 

Some bodies were buried with copper beads and ornaments, others with engraved shell pendants, both of which are characteristic of Southern Cult societies from this period. The shells found in this area are clam shells and turtle shells, most likely coming from the nearby lake and river.

By digging a trench into the center of the largest mound, McDonald found refuse pits that contained effigy appendages, bone hair ornaments, engraved vessels and bottles, fire basin fragments, and antler bones. There were also two hut structures and altars found within the mound, and this combined with the placement of the burial sites surrounding the mound indicates that it was a temple mound. 

Potsherds and flint tools were also very common in this area; the engravings of square crosses and suns on the fragments of pottery are very similar to designs across the broader Mississippian region, and the flint tools were spears and knives that sometimes had notches.

References

Archaeological sites in Illinois
Fulton County, Illinois